Thomas P. Colantuono (born October 4, 1951) is an American attorney who served as the United States Attorney for the District of New Hampshire from 2001 to 2009. He previously served in the New Hampshire Senate from the 14th district from 1990 to 1996 and on the New Hampshire Executive Council from the 4th district from 1999 to 2001. He ran for New Hampshire's 1st congressional district in the 1996 election. He lost the Republican primary to John E. Sununu.

References

1951 births
Living people
Republican Party New Hampshire state senators
Members of the Executive Council of New Hampshire
United States Attorneys for the District of New Hampshire